Something's on Your Mind is the third studio album by the American urban/post-disco group D Train, released in 1984 by Prelude Records in the US and United Kingdom. The album was remastered by Canadian label Unidisc Music in 1992 including five bonus tracks.

The album was produced by its musical group member Hubert Eaves III. Recording Sessions began in late 1983 and finished in mid 1984.

The album's title track was D Train's only entry on the Billboard Hot 100, peaking at #79. It would be covered by jazz trumpeter Miles Davis for his 1985 album, You're Under Arrest.

Track listing

(*) Bonus tracks on the remastered version.

References

External links
Something's on Your Mind at Discogs

1984 albums
D Train (music group) albums